Yuri Viktorovich Klimenko (Russian: Ю́рий Ви́кторович Климе́нко; born March 24, 1944, Dnipropetrovsk, Ukrainian SSR) is a Soviet and Russian   cinematographer and photographer, laureate of State Prize (2000), a sixfold winner of the Nika Award (1999, 2001, 2006, 2011, 2015, 2019).

He worked with such directors as Stanislav Govorukhin, Georgiy Daneliya, Sergei Solovyov, Alexei Uchitel, Aleksei German Sr., Sergei Paradjanov.

Selected filmography 
About Vitya, Masha and the Marines (1973, Mikhail Ptashuk)
Contraband (1974, Stanislav Govorukhin)
The Man is after Birds (1975, Ali Hamroyev)
The Bodyguard (1979, Ali Hamroyev)
 Tears Were Falling (1982,  Georgiy Daneliya)
 A Simple Death (1985, Alexander Kaidanovsky)
 The Legend of Suram Fortress  (1985, Sergei Paradjanov)
Wild Pigeon (1986, Sergei Solovyov)
 Black Rose Is an Emblem of Sorrow, Red Rose Is an Emblem of Love  (1990, Sergei Solovyov)
 Anna Karamazoff  (1991, Rustam Khamdamov)
 Three Sisters  (1994, Sergei Solovyov)
 His Wife's Diary (2000, Alexei Uchitel)
 The Stroll (2003, Alexei Uchitel)
 Dreaming of Space (2005, Alexei Uchitel)
 Captive (2008, Alexei Uchitel)
 The Edge (2010, Alexei Uchitel)
 Break Loose (2013, Alexei Uchitel)
Mom Blog Grader (2014, Andrey Silkin)
 Matilda (2017, Alexei Uchitel)

References

External links
 
 Острова. Юрий Клименко

1944 births
Living people
Film people from Dnipro
Russian people of Ukrainian descent
Soviet cinematographers
Russian cinematographers
State Prize of the Russian Federation laureates
Recipients of the Nika Award
Soviet photographers
Russian photographers
Gerasimov Institute of Cinematography alumni